Francisco Meira Meixedo (born 19 May 2001) is a Portuguese professional footballer who plays for FC Porto as a goalkeeper.

Club career
Born in Porto, Meixedo spent his entire youth career in the ranks of FC Porto. He made his LigaPro debut for their reserves on 18 August 2019 in a 1–1 home draw against Varzim SC, as a 69th-minute substitute for Rodrigo Valente after the dismissal of Ricardo Silva. The following 26 July he was in the first team's matchday squad for the first time, remaining unused as Diogo Costa played in the 2–1 loss at S.C. Braga on the last day of the season for the Primeira Liga champions.

On 15 April 2021, Meixedo renewed his contract until 2023. He earned a league medal in the 2021–22 campaign, replacing third-choice Cláudio Ramos in the last minute of a 2–0 home win over G.D. Estoril Praia on 14 May.

Honours
Porto Youth
UEFA Youth League: 2018–19

Porto
Primeira Liga: 2021–22

References

External links

2001 births
Living people
Portuguese footballers
Footballers from Porto
Association football goalkeepers
Primeira Liga players
Liga Portugal 2 players
Padroense F.C. players
FC Porto B players
FC Porto players
Portugal youth international footballers